The 2015 Lamborghini Super Trofeo season is the seventh season of the European Super Trofeo, the third season of the North American Super Trofeo and the fourth season of the Asian Super Trofeo. Every championship features six double-header rounds, with each race lasting for a duration of 50 minutes. 2015 marks the first season of the Huracán LP620-2 Super Trofeo.

The 2015 Super Trofeo World Final will be held from 19 to 22 November at Sebring International Raceway.

Super Trofeo Europe

Calendar

Entries

Results summary

Super Trofeo North America

Calendar

Entries

Results summary

Super Trofeo Asia

Calendar

Results summary

References

External links

Lamborghini Super Trofeo
Lamborghini Super Trofeo seasons